Isotron is the trade name for a shortwave antenna marketed by Bilal Co. for use as an amateur radio transmitting antenna for restricted spaces. It is physically short as compared to a dipole antenna for a given frequency. It consists of a coil placed between two angled sheet metal plates. The bandwidth of the Isotron is quite narrow as compared with a dipole antenna. This is most pronounced on the lower frequency bands.

References

Radio frequency antenna types
Antennas (radio)